Luol Ajou Deng  (born 16 April 1985) is a British former professional basketball player. He was a two-time NBA All-Star and was named to the NBA All-Defensive Second Team in 2012. Born in what is now South Sudan, Deng fled the country with his family as a child, eventually settling in the United Kingdom. He became a British citizen in 2006, and has played for the Great Britain national team.

After playing college basketball for the Duke Blue Devils, Deng was selected by the Phoenix Suns in the first round of the 2004 NBA draft with the seventh overall pick. He was named to the NBA All-Rookie First Team as a 19-year-old in 2005. The small forward was an All-Star with the Bulls in 2012 and 2013 before splitting the 2013–14 season with the Cleveland Cavaliers. After just half a season with Cleveland, Deng joined the Miami Heat for 2014–15. He played two seasons for the Heat before signing with the Lakers in 2016. He spent his last season with the Minnesota Timberwolves.

Early life
Deng was born in Wau, Sudan (now in South Sudan) and is a member of the Dinka ethnic group. When he was young, his father Aldo, a member of the Sudanese parliament, moved the family to Egypt to escape the Second Sudanese Civil War. In Egypt, they met former NBA center Manute Bol, another Dinka, who taught Deng's older brother, Ajou Deng, how to play basketball and also mentored Luol. When they were granted political asylum, his family immigrated to Brixton, South London.

Deng was educated at St. Mary's RC High School, a voluntary aided state comprehensive school in Croydon in South London. He developed an interest in football, admiring Faustino Asprilla of Newcastle United, but also continued to play basketball, and was invited to join England's 15-and-under team in that sport. During this time, he began his career at Brixton Basketball Club. He represented Croydon at the London Youth Games, and was inducted into their Hall of Fame. At age 13, he played for England's squad in the European Junior Men's Qualifying Tournament, averaging 40 points and 14 rebounds. He was named the (MVP) of the tournament. Next, he led England to the finals of the European Junior National Tournament, where he averaged (34) points and earned another (MVP) award.

At age 14, Luol moved to the United States to play basketball at Blair Academy in New Jersey. One of his teammates was future (NBA) player Charlie Villanueva. Deng was also named a Tri-Captain at Blair along with Villanueva. During his senior year, Deng was considered the second most promising high school senior in America after LeBron James and was named First Team All-America by Parade and USA Today. He was selected to play in the McDonald's High School All-America game, but could not play due to a foot injury.

Considered a five-star recruit by Rivals.com, Deng was listed as the No. 1 small forward and the No. 2 player in the nation in 2003.

College career
Deng accepted an athletic scholarship to attend Duke University, where he played for coach Mike Krzyzewski's Duke Blue Devils basketball team in 2003–04. In one season at Duke, he appeared in 37 games and made 32 starts. He averaged 30.1 minutes and scored 15.1 points per game en route to a berth in the 2004 Final Four. He was only the 10th freshman in ACC history to lead all freshmen in scoring, rebounding, and field goal percentage.

Professional career

Chicago Bulls (2004–2014)

2004–05 season
After one year at Duke, Deng entered the 2004 NBA draft. He was picked seventh overall by the Phoenix Suns, but was immediately traded to the Chicago Bulls by prior agreement. Deng suffered a season-ending wrist injury late in his rookie season, but still made the NBA All-Rookie First Team and helped the resurgent Bulls return to the playoffs for the first time in seven years. Deng played in 61 games and averaged 11.7 points per game. On 8 February, Deng recorded his first double-double vs. the Dallas Mavericks.

2005–06 season
In his second season, he posted strong performances throughout March and April to help the Bulls earn their second consecutive playoff berth. His offensive statistics improved in his sophomore season, increasing his scoring to 14.3 points per game, and increasing his rebounding to 6.6 per game, up from a 5.3 average his rookie season. Deng had four straight double-double performances from 28 February to 5 March, with at least ten points and rebounds in each game. In the playoffs, the Bulls faced off against the Miami Heat in a best of 7-game series. Deng came off the bench in all six games, averaging ten points per game.

2006–07 season
For the 2006–07 season, Deng was the only Bull to start all 82 regular season games. All of his numbers continued to improve, and he led the team in minutes played (37.5) and field goal percentage (.517), while playing a strong second scoring option to Ben Gordon, with a marked improvement to 18.8 points per game. Deng also notably rarely committed fouls on defense (2.00 per game), despite the minutes he played and frequently being outsized in matchups against power forwards such as Kevin Garnett.

On 27 December 2006, Deng was driving in the lane when Miami Heat player James Posey grabbed him, causing concern that Deng may have re-injured his wrist. Posey earned a flagrant foul, was ejected and suspended for one game. Deng scored 32 points against the Cavaliers just three nights later, resolving concern that the wrist would be re-injured. On 26 March 2007 Deng posted a new career-high 38 points to lead the Bulls to a home victory against the Portland Trail Blazers. Deng converted 18 of his 25 shots from the field.

Deng has won three major sportsmanship awards. On 3 May 2007, Deng won the NBA's sportsmanship award in a vote by players. The award honours the player who best exemplifies ethical behaviour, fair play, and integrity on the court. For that award, the league donated $25,000 on his behalf to Pacific Garden Mission, the oldest continuously operating rescue mission in the country. Deng also won the 2006–2007 Golden Icon Award for Best Sports Role Model. The awards are presented by the Travolta entertainment family. Most recently, he won the 2008 UN Refugee Agency's Humanitarian of the Year Award as part of the UNHCR's ninemillion.org campaign to bring education and sports to millions of displaced children.

2007–08 season
Near the beginning of the season, the Bulls started negotiating a contract extension for Deng. Negotiations were mostly handled by Bulls chairman Jerry Reinsdorf. The team offered Deng a five-year extension for $57.5 million. However, Deng decided to reject the deal and wait until the season ended to continue negotiations.

In the (2007–08) season, Luol played in (63) games, missing (19) mostly because of left Achilles tendinitis. Despite injuries, Deng still averaged (17.0) points per game and (6.3) rebounds per game. He had his best game against the Milwaukee Bucks when he scored (32) points in a 151–135 victory. The Bulls missed the playoffs in the (2007–08) season for the first time since 2004.

2008–09 season

Before the season started, Deng agreed to a contract extension for six years and ($71) million. The agreement was announced by Bulls general manager, John Paxson. Paxson said in a statement "Signing Luol has always been a priority for this organization and we have always felt that he was a big part of our future. We are very happy that Luol will now be with us long term as we continue to grow as an organization."

Due to injury, Deng played in (48) games. During the regular season Luol's scoring dropped to (14.1) points per game and his rebounding dropped to 6.0 per game. The Bulls made the playoffs, but Luol missed the entire playoffs due to injury.

2009–10 season
Deng played in a total of 70 games during the 2009–10 season, also increasing his scoring and rebounding to 17.6 and 7.3 respectively, helping the Bulls make the playoffs again. He missed 11 straight games at the end of March because of a sprained right calf.

During the first-round of the playoffs, Deng averaged (34.8) points per game along with (5.0) rebounds per game against the Cleveland Cavaliers. He scored (26) points in the final game, but couldn't prevent the Bulls being eliminated by the Cavs.<ref>LeBron, Cavs eliminate Bulls, face Celtics next  on Yahoo! Sports; Withers, Tom (28 April 2010)</ref>

2010–11 season
On 1 November 2010, Deng scored a new career-high 40 points, hitting (14) of his (19) shots, along with 9 of 11 free throws, against the Portland Trail Blazers, scoring a point a minute. On 24 February 2011, Deng scored 20 points, 10 rebounds, and hit the game winning 3-point shot with 16 seconds left on the clock in a game against the Miami Heat. Throughout the season, Deng significantly improved his 3-point shooting after coach Tom Thibodeau asked him to. In the past four seasons, Deng attempted 132 3-point shots, whereas this season he attempted 333, hitting 115 for a 34%.

Deng finished the season averaging 17.4 points and 5.8 rebounds per game, being the third lead scorer for the Chicago Bulls behind Derrick Rose (25.0) and Carlos Boozer (17.5). This was also Deng's seventh season averaging double figures. During the first round of the playoffs against the Indiana Pacers, Deng averaged 18.6 points and 6.2 rebounds per game, being the second leading scorer of the team behind Derrick Rose.

On 31 March 2011, Eric Bressman of Dime magazine called Deng "the most underrated player" writing he was "never the face of the franchise but always the backbone". Coach Thibodeau has consistently called Deng the "glue" that holds the Bulls together. "Luol's professional. He practices hard. He prepares well. He studies his opponent. He's great at executing offensively and defensively. He's helped this team get better every day," said Thibodeau.

Deng was the Bulls' second leading scorer during the playoffs. In the first game of the Eastern Conference Finals against the Miami Heat, Deng was praised for his defense on LeBron James. However, the Miami Heat went on to eliminate the Bulls in five games.Derrick Rose, Luol Deng, Chicago Bulls overpower Miami Heat to take Game 1 of Eastern finals, 103–82  on New York Daily News (15 May 2011) Deng averaged just under 43 minutes, 16.9 points, 6.6 rebounds and 2.7 assists per game during the playoffs.

2011–12 season: All-Star season

Deng injured his wrist during the fourth quarter against the Charlotte Bobcats on 21 January 2012. Initially thought to be a minor injury, it was later revealed by an (MRI) that Deng tore the ligament in his left wrist. Deng decided to postpone surgery and play the rest of the season through the pain. He returned to the starting line-up against the Milwaukee Bucks on 4 February 2012, scoring 21 points with 9 rebounds, 1 steal, and 1 block.

On 9 February 2012, Deng was selected as a reserve for the (2012) NBA All-Star Game's Eastern Conference team, joining teammate Derrick Rose, who was voted in as a starter. This was the first time since 1997 (when both Michael Jordan and Scottie Pippen made the team) that the Chicago Bulls had two All-Stars in the All-Star Game.

Deng made a buzzer-beating game winner on 24 March 2012, off a tip-in basket to lift the Bulls 102–101 in overtime versus the Toronto Raptors. At the end of the season, Deng was selected for the NBA All-Defensive Second Team.

2012–13 season: Second All-Star season
Deng was selected as a reserve for the 2013 NBA All-Star Game, along with Joakim Noah. During the 2012–13 season, he averaged a team high 16.5 points per game, 6.3 rebounds per game, and a career high 3 assists per game. His free throw percentage of .816 was also a career high. He again led the league in minutes per game with (38.7). Even without Derrick Rose, who was out for the whole year due to an ACL injury, the Bulls still tallied a 45–37 record, finishing 5th in the Eastern Conference and 2nd in the Central Division.

The Chicago Bulls met the Brooklyn Nets in the opening round of the (2013) Playoffs. The Bulls defeated the Nets in seven games and met the Miami Heat in the semi-finals. The Heat defeated the Bulls in five games. The Heat went on to win the (2013) NBA Finals. During the 2013 Playoffs, Deng averaged (13.8) points per game, (7.6) rebounds per game, and 3.8 assists per game in (44.8) minutes per game.

2013–14 season
Deng's representatives and Chicago Bulls executives had informal talks about extending his contract over the summer, but the team never made a formal offer. Deng, who would become a free agent after the 2013–14 season, was seeking a contract close to $12 million a year over 4–5 seasons. Rumors about him being traded continued throughout the season.

During the first months of the season, Deng again emerged as the Bulls leading scorer with the absence of Derrick Rose. He had his best performances on 27 and 30 November, when he scored 27 points against the Detroit Pistons and the Cleveland Cavaliers in two separate games. He also registered 6 rebounds against the Pistons, and 11 assists against the Cavs. During the first two months of the season, Deng averaged a career-high of 19 points and (3.7) assists per game. He also averaged 6.9 rebounds per game.

Cleveland Cavaliers (2014)
On 7 January 2014, the Chicago Bulls traded Deng to the Cleveland Cavaliers for Andrew Bynum, two future second round draft picks in 2015 and 2016 (initially traded from the Portland Trail Blazers to the Cavaliers), a protected future pick the Cavaliers received from the Sacramento Kings, and the right to swap first round picks with the Cavaliers in the 2015 draft. At the time of the trade, Deng was the fifth-longest tenured Chicago Bull, and fourth-leading scorer in franchise history.

In his Cavaliers debut, Deng had 10 points, 1 rebound, 1 steal, and 4 turnovers in 21 minutes. Two games later, he scored 27 points with five rebounds, four assists, and one block. This was his highest scoring game with the Cavaliers. Deng finished the season averaging 14.1 points and 2.5 assists.

Miami Heat (2014–2016)
On 15 July 2014, Deng signed with the Miami Heat. He had his best scoring game of the 2014–15 season on 20 January, when he scored 29 points against the Philadelphia 76ers. Deng finished the season averaging 14 points and 5.2 rebounds per game.

On 29 June 2015, Deng exercised his player option for the 2015–16 season. On 1 August 2015, Deng played for Team Africa at the 2015 NBA Africa exhibition game. In late November and early December 2015, Deng missed six games with a left hamstring strain. On 19 February 2016, he scored a season-high 30 points in a 115–111 win over the Atlanta Hawks. The Heat finished the regular season as the third seed in the Eastern Conference with a 48–34 record. In the first round of the playoffs, the Heat faced the sixth-seeded Charlotte Hornets, and in a Game 1 win on 17 April, Deng set a Heat playoff debut record with 31 points on 11-for-13 shooting.

Los Angeles Lakers (2016–2018)
On 7 July 2016, Deng signed a four-year, $72 million contract with the Los Angeles Lakers. The Lakers signed the two-time All-Star along with Timofey Mozgov to big contracts in a bid to remain competitive after Kobe Bryant's recent retirement. However, in February 2017, Magic Johnson became the Lakers' president of basketball operations, and coach Luke Walton benched Deng to start rookie Brandon Ingram. Effectively, Deng had played his last meaningful minutes as a Laker. He missed the final 22 games of the season after being shut down in March to give more playing time to the team's youngsters.

On opening night of the 2017–18 season, Deng made a substitute start in place of a suspended Kentavious Caldwell-Pope; it was the only game he played the entire season. He and Walton mutually decided that it was better for him to stay in the locker room during games than to play meaningless minutes in garbage time. On September 1, 2018, he was waived by the Lakers after reaching a buyout agreement. The move freed him to find playing time elsewhere, while the Lakers gained salary cap space to potentially offer a maximum contract to a free agent in 2019. Deng had been the highest-paid Laker in each of his two seasons.

Minnesota Timberwolves (2018–2019)
On September 10, 2018, Deng signed with the Minnesota Timberwolves, reuniting him with Derrick Rose, Jimmy Butler, Taj Gibson, and head coach Tom Thibodeau. On February 11, 2019, Deng started in place of an ill Andrew Wiggins and scored 12 points in a team-high 37 minutes, 50 seconds against the Los Angeles Clippers. It was Deng's first start since October 19, 2017, his lone game for the Lakers during the 2017–18 season.

Deng's final NBA game was played on February 27, 2019 in a 123 - 131 loss to the Atlanta Hawks. In his final game, Deng recorded 1 steal, 1 rebound and no other stats in 8 minutes of playing time.

He would go on to sign a one day contract with the Bulls to retire with the team.

Citizenship and national team career
Since his birth in Sudan, Deng has lived in Egypt, the United Kingdom, and the United States. Deng represented England at Under-16 and Under-19 level, and was an ambassador for the London 2012 Summer Olympics. In October 2006, Deng became a naturalised British citizen in a ceremony in Croydon and was called up to play in European competition for the Great Britain team. He made his debut in a closed international test match against Georgia in Pau, France, on 9 August 2007, scoring 19 points. In his first competitive qualifying game representing Great Britain, Deng collected 21 points, 10 rebounds, two assists, three steals and two blocks against Slovakia, at Birmingham's National Indoor Arena on 21 August 2007. He played with the team at the 2012 Summer Olympics, where he averaged 15.8 points, 6.6 rebounds, and 4.6 assists. However, Great Britain finished with a 1–4 record.

Deng retains South Sudanese citizenship in addition to his British citizenship, making him a dual citizen.

Post-playing career
On November 24, 2020, it was reported that Deng would coach the South Sudan national basketball team for the FIBA AfroBasket 2021 Qualifiers.

Personal life
Deng is involved in numerous charities, such as the UK children's charity School Home Support. He has been noted for his work on behalf of the Lost Boys of Sudan and other refugees.McRae, Donald. "Luol Deng: Britain's secret superstar" , The Guardian, 14 September 2009. During the summers of 2006 and 2007, Luol went to Africa, Asia and Europe with the NBA for their Basketball Without Borders Tour. He is also a spokesperson for the World Food Programme. "He really does epitomize everything I had hoped for as a person and a basketball player", general manager John Paxson said. "I think it's one of the reasons we've gotten to the level we're at this year. I'm truly proud of him. I think the world of him as a person and as a player."

He counts himself a fan of English Premier League side Arsenal F.C.

Deng is the cover athlete for NBA Live 09 and NBA Live 10 video games in the UK.

Deng's cousin, Peter Jok, also plays professional basketball.

Deng has been investing in real estate almost since the time he entered the league in 2004 and has amassed a large portfolio, including hotels, resorts, condos, and apartment buildings, worth $125 million. In 2020, Deng was included in the annual Powerlist'' as one of the most influential people in the UK of African/African-Caribbean descent.

In November 2019, he was appointed for four years as president of the South Sudan Basketball Federation.

Luol Deng is depicted on one of the Brixton Pound community currency notes.

Deng was appointed Officer of the Order of the British Empire (OBE) in the 2021 Birthday Honours for services to basketball.

Career statistics

NBA

Regular season

|-
| align="left" | 
| align="left" | Chicago
| 61 || 45 || 27.3 || .434 || .265 || .741 || 5.3 || 2.2 || .8 || .4 || 11.7
|-
| align="left" | 
| align="left" | Chicago
| 78 || 56 || 33.4 || .463 || .269 || .750 || 6.6 || 1.9 || .9 || .6 || 14.3
|-
| align="left" | 
| align="left" | Chicago
| 82 || 82 || 37.5 || .517 || .143 || .777 || 7.1 || 2.5 || 1.2 || .6 || 18.8
|-
| align="left" | 
| align="left" | Chicago
| 63 || 59 || 33.8 || .479 || .364 || .770 || 6.3 || 2.5 || .9 || .5 || 17.0
|-
| align="left" | 
| align="left" | Chicago
| 49 || 46 || 34.0 || .448 || .400 || .796 || 6.0 || 1.9 || 1.2 || .5 || 14.1
|-
| align="left" | 
| align="left" | Chicago
| 70 || 69 || 37.9 || .466 || .386 || .764 || 7.3 || 2.0 || .9 || .9 || 17.6
|-
| align="left" | 
| align="left" | Chicago
| 82 || 82 || 39.1 || .460 || .345 || .750 || 5.8 || 2.8 || 1.0 || .6 || 17.4
|-
| align="left" | 
| align="left" | Chicago
| 54 || 54 || style="background:#cfecec;"| 39.4* || .412 || .367 || .770 || 6.5 || 2.9 || 1.0 || .7 || 15.3
|-
| align="left" | 
| align="left" | Chicago
| 75 || 75 || style="background:#cfecec;"| 38.7* || .426 || .322 || .816 || 6.3 || 3.0 || 1.1 || .4 || 16.5
|-
| align="left" | 
| align="left" | Chicago
| 23 || 23 || 37.4 || .452 || .274 || .815 || 6.9 || 3.7 || 1.0 || .2 || 19.0
|-
| align="left" | 
| align="left" | Cleveland
| 40 || 40 || 33.8 || .417 || .315 || .771 || 5.1 || 2.5 || 1.0 || .1 || 14.3
|-
| align="left" | 
| align="left" | Miami
| 72 || 72 || 33.6 || .469 || .355 || .761 || 5.2 || 1.9 || .9 || .3 || 14.0
|-
| align="left" | 
| align="left" | Miami
| 74 || 73 || 32.4 || .455 || .344 || .755 || 6.0 || 1.9 || 1.0 || .4 || 12.3
|-
| align="left" | 
| align="left" | L.A. Lakers
| 56 || 49 || 26.5 || .387 || .309|| .730 || 5.3 || 1.3 || .9 || .4 || 7.6
|-
| align="left" | 
| align="left" | L.A. Lakers
| 1 || 1 || 13.0 || .500 || – || – || .0 || 1.0 || 1.0 || .0 || 2.0
|-
| align="left" | 
| align="left" | Minnesota
| 22 || 2 || 17.8 || .500 || .318 || .714 || 3.3 || .8 || .7 || .4 || 7.1
|-
|- class="sortbottom"
|style="text-align:center;" colspan="2"|Career
| 902 || 828 || 34.3 || .456 || .332 || .769 || 6.1 || 2.3 || 1.0 || .5 || 14.8
|-
|- class="sortbottom"
|style="text-align:center;" colspan="2"|All-Star
| 2 || 0 || 11.5 || .333 || .200 || 1.000 || 1.0 || 1.0 || .0 || .0 || 5.0

Playoffs

|-
| align="left" | 2006
| align="left" | Chicago
| 6 || 0 || 30.0 || .429 || .200 || .571 || 4.8 || .5 || .8 || .7 || 10.2
|-
| align="left" | 2007
| align="left" | Chicago
| 10 || 10 || 41.0 || .524 || .000 || .807 || 8.7 || 2.4 || 1.0 || .7 || 22.2
|-
| align="left" | 2010
| align="left" | Chicago
| 5 || 5 || 40.6 || .463 || .083 || .731 || 5.0 || 1.4 || 1.2 || .8 || 18.8
|-
| align="left" | 2011
| align="left" | Chicago
| 16 || 16 || 42.9 || .426 || .324 || .839 || 6.6 || 2.7 || 1.5 || .6 || 16.9
|-
| align="left" | 2012
| align="left" | Chicago
| 6 || 6 || 38.0 || .456 || .364 || .571 || 8.3 || 1.5 || .8 || 1.5 || 14.0
|-
| align="left" | 2013
| align="left" | Chicago
| 5 || 5 || 44.8 || .381 || .056 || .400 || 7.6 || 3.8 || 1.0 || .6 || 13.8
|-
| align="left" | 2016
| align="left" | Miami
| 14 || 14 || 35.4 || .471 || .421 || .842 || 5.9 || 1.6 || .9 || .6 || 13.3
|-
|- class="sortbottom"
|style="text-align:center;" colspan="2"|Career
| 62 || 56 || 39.1 || .455 || .311 || .765 || 7.0 || 6.7 || 1.1 || .7 || 15.9

College

|-
| style="text-align:left;"| 2003–04
| style="text-align:left;"| Duke
| 37 || 32 || 31.1 || .476 || .360 || .710 || 6.9 || 1.8 || 1.3 || 1.1 || 15.1

See also

 List of National Basketball Association annual minutes leaders
 List of European basketball players in the United States

References

External links

 
 Duke profile
 Great Britain Basketball Profile
 Deng: A real-life globetrotter making it in the NBA
 Deng gunning for bullish future

1985 births
Living people
Basketball players at the 2012 Summer Olympics
Black British sportsmen
Blair Academy alumni
British men's basketball players
South Sudanese refugees
British expatriate basketball people in the United States
Chicago Bulls players
Cleveland Cavaliers players
Dinka people
Duke Blue Devils men's basketball players
People from Brixton
Los Angeles Lakers players
McDonald's High School All-Americans
Miami Heat players
Minnesota Timberwolves players
National Basketball Association All-Stars
National Basketball Association players from the United Kingdom
Naturalised citizens of the United Kingdom
Olympic basketball players of Great Britain
Parade High School All-Americans (boys' basketball)
People from South Norwood
Phoenix Suns draft picks
Small forwards
South Sudanese emigrants to the United Kingdom
South Sudanese expatriate basketball people in the United States
South Sudanese men's basketball players
Officers of the Order of the British Empire
Refugees in Egypt
People from Western Bahr el Ghazal